Polo Osvaldo Ernesto Piatti is a British-Argentine composer, concert pianist and conductor. He has performed his own music in three continents.

Early life and education
Piatti started piano lessons at the age of 3 in Buenos Aires, becoming a concert pianist and classical improviser in his youth. At 12 he was admitted to the Conservatorio Nacional Superior de Música in Buenos Aires, Argentina, and graduated with distinction as Profesor National de Musica. Leaving South America at the age of sixteen to pursue an international career and continue his music studies in Paris and Berlin,   becoming known as a professional composer, arranger, concert pianist, musical director, conductor, singing coach, instrumental teacher, artist developer, artist manager and music publisher in numerous territories including Spain, France, Germany, Austria and Switzerland. Whilst touring as a concert pianist, Piatti gained acclaim for his innovative classical piano improvisations

Music career

A move to the United Kingdom during the early 1990s led to him becoming teacher and Head of Music at the Italia Conti Academy of Theatre Arts. Piatti co-founded the drama school Die Freie Kleintheaterschule with the late Frieder Nögge  during 1996 in Stuttgart, Germany, writing and performing a variety of plays with the school. Around this time, he also worked with the French avant-garde video artist Didier Bay, at the 'DAAD Academy' in Berlin. After spending a number of years in London coaching and developing other artists, Piatti returned to his roots, composing and performing his own works

Settling in Hastings, East Sussex, he was appointed 'Composer in Residence' at St Mary in the Castle - a former church in Hastings that became a performance space. A tour of Japan followed in November 2012 premiering the work 'Sentimental Journey' with the Osaka Concert Orchestra, giving classical piano improvisations concerts in Osaka and Tokyo.

Following the tour of Japan he inaugurated  the  International Composers Festival during 2012 in Hastings, East Sussex, United Kingdom.
Collaborations with the Bolshoi’s eminent choreographer Yury Grigorovich and the late prima ballerina Natalia Bessmertnova as Director of Music of the World Centre of Performing Arts followed
Piatti also founded the "Hastings Sinfonia orchestra" in 2012, becoming Artistic Director.

After launching a recording of Sentimental Journey in 2016, engineered by Grammy Award winner Jan Holzner, Piatti performed with and conducted the City of Prague Philharmonic Orchestra, recording with them alongside James Fitzpatrick.
In 2016, a collaboration British screenwriter/dramatist Roy Apps on his first opera ‘Mata Hari’ took place; the opera being based on the life of the First World War spy and dancer of the same name. In 2017, he opened the Opus Theatre in Hastings, the theatre providing a versatile performance space for all forms of theatre and music. During June 2020, the premiere performance of his multi-faith oratorio 'Libera Nos' for five soloists, mixed choir, children's choir and full symphony orchestra was scheduled, this being believed to be the first oratorio of its kind
On the 13th October 2019 Polo Piatti’s Bohemian Concerto for piano and orchestra was premiered, by Steinway pianist Thomas Pandolfi with the Symphonicity Orchestra under conductor Daniel W. Boothe to a standing-ovation at the Sandler’s Centre for Performing Arts in Virginia Beach, Virginia, USA.

Professional affiliations

Piatti is a Member of the British Academy of Songwriters, Composers and Authors and was elected as a member of the Royal Society of Musicians of Great Britain in February 2016.

References

External links
 Official website

20th-century classical composers
British classical composers
British classical pianists
1954 births
21st-century classical composers
Argentine classical pianists
Living people
People from Buenos Aires